Suncorp Place (formerly AAPT Centre) is a skyscraper located in Sydney, Australia on Grosvenor and Lang Street. It was designed for Qantas by Joseland & Gilling architects, and was completed in 1982. The Centre is used for commercial offices and is 182m tall, and 42 levels high, to the roof, although the rooftop structure brings the total height to 193m. The majority of floor space is occupied by Suncorp; the remainder by a mix of mainly financial businesses.

See also 
 List of tallest buildings in Sydney

References 

Skyscrapers in Sydney
Office buildings in Sydney
Office buildings completed in 1982
Brutalist architecture in Australia
1982 establishments in Australia
Skyscraper office buildings in Australia
Sydney central business district